Cellio is a frazione of Cellio con Breia in the Province of Vercelli in the Italian region Piedmont, located about  northeast of Turin and about  north of Vercelli.

References

Cities and towns in Piedmont
Cellio con Breia
Frazioni of the Province of Vercelli